James Rowan Chatterton Dickson (born 16 January 1964) is a Labour Co-op Councillor for Herne Hill at Lambeth Council, he also serves as Cabinet Member for Health and Social Care (along with Cllr Lucy Caldicott), having previously been the Council's Cabinet Member for Finance and also its Leader.

Early life and career 
He was educated at the public school Wellington College, as a result of being a child of a serving Royal Navy Officer, and Cambridge University where he read Social and Political Sciences. Whilst at Cambridge he was elected as Chair of the Cambridge University Labour Club. 

From 1989, Dickson worked for the London Housing Unit as a Senior Policy Officer for ten years.

In 1998 he was a Visiting Lecturer at the University of Westminster until 2000.

Between 2000 and 2003 he worked as an Associate for Weber Shandwick.

He previously worked for the consultancy firm Four Communications as Politics Director. He is a member of the Association of Professional Political Consultants.

Political career 
Dickson was first elected as a Councillor for Herne Hill (ward) in the 1990 Lambeth London Borough Council election, he quickly rose up the ranks to be Leader of Lambeth Council in 1994.

At the 2001 General Election he was Labour's candidate in Old Bexley and Sidcup.

Cllr Dickson has continuously been a member of the Cabinet of Lambeth Council since 2009 and has held various positions (such as Finance and Voluntary and Community Sectors), currently serving as Cabinet Member for Health and Social Care since 23 April 2020.

Politically he is identified with the right wing of the Labour Party and was leading Lambeth's Labour Group when it was described as "more New Labour than New Labour" by then Prime Minister, Tony Blair. He is a member of Progressive Britain.

References

1964 births
Living people
Labour Party (UK) councillors
Councillors in the London Borough of Lambeth
Leaders of local authorities of England